Gleeson is an Irish surname. It is an anglicisation of the Irish name Ó Glasáin or Ó Gliasáin. The name is most common in County Tipperary but originates in East County Cork, in the once powerful Uí Liatháin kingdom, where the Gleesons were great lords and sometimes kings. Notable people with the surname include:

Adrian Gleeson (born 1967), Australian rules football player
Bill Gleeson (1931–1998), Australian rules footballer with St Kilda
Brendan Gleeson (born 1955), Irish actor
Brian Gleeson (actor) (born 1987), son of Brendan
Brian Gleeson (Australian rules footballer) (born 1934)
Dan Gleeson (born 1985), English football player
Dave Gleeson (born 1968), Australian rock singer
Dermot Gleeson (born 1949), Irish barrister, government adviser, and businessman
Dermot Gleeson (BBC) (born 1949), British governor of BBC
Domhnall Gleeson (born 1983), Irish actor, son of Brendan
Edward Burton Gleeson (1803–1870), South Australian pioneer, founder of the town of Clare
Hampton Gleeson (1834–1907), Australian miner, pastoralist, politician and brewer
Irene Gleeson (1944–2013), Australian humanitarian
Jack Gleeson (born 1992), Irish actor
Jacqueline Gleeson, Australian judge, daughter of Murray Gleeson
Jake Gleeson (born 1990), New Zealand football goalkeeper
James Gleeson (born 1915), Australian surrealist artist, poet, and writer
John Gleeson (disambiguation), multiple people:
John Gleeson (cricketer) (1938-2016), Australian cricketer
John Gleeson (hurler) (born 1941), Irish hurler
John Gleeson (judge) (born 1953), American judge
John Gleeson (rugby league) (born 1938), Australian rugby league footballer
Johnny Tom Gleeson (1853–1924), Irish poet and songwriter
Justin Gleeson the former Solicitor-General of Australia
Keith Gleeson (born 1976), Irish Australian rugby union football player
Maree Gleeson, Australian immunologist
Martin Gleeson (born 1980), English rugby league player
Martin Gleeson (born 1994), Australian rules football player
Murray Gleeson (born 1938), Australian jurist, Chief Justice of the High Court of Australia
Paul Gleeson (disambiguation), several people:
 Paul Gleeson (magician) (born 1987), Irish TV magician, mentalist and escapologist
 Paul Gleeson (tennis) (1880–1956), American tennis player
Robert Gleeson (1873–1919), South African cricketer
Sean Gleeson (rugby league) (born 1987), English rugby league player
Seán Gleeson, British actor, director and producer
Simon Gleeson (born 1977), Australian soap opera actor in the UK
Stephen Gleeson (born 1988), Irish professional football player
Thomas Gleeson (disambiguation), multiple people
Trevor Gleeson (born 1966), Australian basketball coach
William Gleeson (disambiguation) several people, including:
William Gleeson (hurler, fl. 1880s) (fl. 1880s) Irish hurler who played for Cork
William Gleeson (priest) (1827-1903), Irish-American historian, linguist, and missionary
Willie Gleeson (1893–1975), Irish hurler who played for Limerick

Fictional characters
Summer Gleeson, character in Batman: The Animated Series
Tiger Gleeson, one of the main protagonists in Round the Twist

See also
Gleason (disambiguation)

Surnames of Irish origin
English-language surnames
Anglicised Irish-language surnames